Michael Schneider was a Jewish leader, who served as Secretary-General of the World Jewish Congress from September 2007 to June 2010.

Early life 
Michael Schneider was born in South Africa.

World Jewish Congress 
Schneider was appointed the Secretary-General of the World Jewish Congress in September 2007.

Schneider left this appointment in 2010.

References 

Living people
Year of birth missing (living people)